Antony Lee "Tony" Benshoof (born July 7, 1975) is an American luger from White Bear Lake, Minnesota who has been competing since 1990.  He won three medals in the mixed team event at the FIL World Luge Championships with two silvers (2004, 2005) and one bronze (2001).

Benshoof was born in Saint Paul, Minnesota.  Competing in three Winter Olympics, Benshoof earned his best finish of fourth by .153 seconds in the men's singles event at Turin in 2006.  He was the highest Olympic finisher for any USA Luge athlete in Men's Singles Luge prior to Chris Mazdzer's silver medal in the 2018 Pyeong Chang olympics. Benshoof also holds records for most international medals won (37) by any USA Men's Singles athlete and most US National titles won.   Every medal Benshoof won was under head coach Wolfgang Schädler (1985–2010).

On October 16, 2001, Benshoof became the Guinness World Record holder for fastest speed on a luge sled at 86.6 mph (139.4 km/h) at the bobsleigh, luge, and skeleton track in Park City, Utah, used for the 2002 Winter Olympics.

His best Luge World Cup overall finish was third in men's singles in 2005-6.

References

FIL-Luge profile
Hickok sports information on World champions in luge and skeleton.
List of men's singles luge World Cup champions since 1978.
Official website
USA luge team profile
US Olympic team website

External links
 
 
 
 
 

1975 births
Living people
American male lugers
Olympic lugers of the United States
Lugers at the 2002 Winter Olympics
Lugers at the 2006 Winter Olympics
Lugers at the 2010 Winter Olympics
Sportspeople from Saint Paul, Minnesota